Yi Zhou (周依) is a film director, writer, producer and multimedia artist who was born in Shanghai, China. At the age of eight she moved to Rome, Italy, and later graduated from the London School of Economics. After leaving university she embarked on a career in Paris, France, as an artist. Zhou has created 3D short art films shown at her solo exhibitions by the Venice Biennale, and has also shown work at the Sundance Film Festival and the Cannes Film Festival. She has also created commissioned by high-end brands such as Chanel, Hennessy and Bobbi Brown.

Yi Zhou is preparing her first feature film, principal photography to start in 2021 Yi Zhou is represented by WME IMG Endeavor and Select Models.

Artistic career

2008-2011 
In 2008, the Comité Vendôme asked Zhou to create a public project for Place Vendôme. She created an artwork based on the symbolic meaning of the Vendôme Column that gives its name to the square. Zhou created two 8 meter-high columns, located on a diagonal axis with the Vendôme Column as the central point. Each of these two columns is composed of 1280 small towers that are placed on a circular. This project was commissioned by art historian Diana Widmaier Picasso and it was presented before the world expo in Shanghai.

In 2010, Zhou relocated back to China and founded YiZhouStudio and production company in Shanghai. She has been compared Yoko Ono and Cindy Sherman by Vogue China as an active image maker switching in front and behind the camera. In 2011, Zhou was also named Tudou.com's (Chinese would-be YouTube) art-director  and serves as art and fashion advisory member at Sina.com, which owns Chinese Twitter (Sina Weibo), she was also named Beauty ambassador of tencent beauty.

From 2010 to 2011, Zhou was brand ambassador for Clarins and sponsored by Clarins for her solo show in Venice during the 54th Venice Biennale in 2011. Since 2012, she has collaborated with the Italian luxury eyewear brand, Persol and Italian luxury brand, Hogan, Pringle, Chanel.

In 2011, her artwork DVF 2011 premiered in Beijing at Pace Gallery commissioned by Diane Von Fustenberg for her exhibition Journey of a Dress. Instead of painting or photographing Diane for her portrait, she created an original video work, music by the Oscar-winning Ennio Morricone, as a moving 3D portrait featuring Diane as an iconic figure from whose mouth other icons escape.

As a Chinese social media ambassador, Yi Zhou also developed a series of online moving portraits of key international players from the movie/fashion/art industries, posted on Tudou.com and Weibo.com. This project introduced these celebrities to the Chinese Twitter users, and introduced Zhou's approach to her work as a multimedia artist by creating portraits for social media only. In September 2011, Zhou created a short film featuring herself and Nicola Formichetti which gained international attention and showing emerging Chinese fashion designers' works.

2011-present 
In 2013, she worked with the French couture jewelry house Gripoix designing their first artist-collection entitled Pineapple's Secret. Her animations have inspired clothing collection by the French hip brand, Each x Other. In the same year she was also hired by Iceberg brand to do a 360 degree clothing capsule collection.

In 2013, Yi Zhou collaborated with Bryan Ferry for a new animated work premiered at her solo exhibition at the Vladivostok Biennale and also showed at her solo exhibition in 2014–2015 at Le Cube in Paris.

In November 2016 she held a solo exhibition at Macro Museum in Rome, since she has been taking a break from art to devote to entrepreneurial and entertainment projects.

Zhou is focusing her endeavors in NFT creations since late 2021 and her feature film debut since 2021.

Modeling career 
Zhou is also a model and has appeared in Vogue (Paris, Italy, Germany, China, Mexico, UK and USA), Uomo Vogue, Elle (US, France), Numéro (China), Marie-Claire (China), Bazaar (China), and i-D (UK and Italy). She has appeared on the cover of Vogue China Beauty, Modern Weekly, South China Morning Post, and Vogue Italia Gioielli.

Zhou has worked with photographers including Karl Lagerfeld, Patrick Demarchelier, Inez and Vinoodh, Jen-Baptiste Mondino, and Raymond Meier.

She has appeared in global advertising campaigns for Persol, Levis, Conrad Hotel, T-Galleria by DFS, Iceberg and Hennessy.

She has been named Shiseido Make up global spokes person 2018–2020.

Yi Zhou took part of Boss campaign in 2022.

Entrepreneurial initiatives 

In 2019 Yi Zhou has launched a fashion and lifestyle brand Global Intuition.

In 2021 Yi Zhou has launched per entertainment companies: Into the Sun entertainment In USA and Into the Sun Films in Italy. Most Recently, She has partnered with Prince Emanuele Filiberto di Savoia with Royal House of Savoy Inc in 2021 to produce TV, features  and fashion around the House of Savoy.

Philanthropy 
Zhou has also actively participated to philanthropic works such as: UN World Climate Change in South Africa UNDP rio+!, for Unesco Marine heritage world and Rush Philanthropics auction in 2015, and most recently for Natalia Vodianova’s Naked Heart Foundation by participating with an artwork commissioned by Etam.

In 2022 in collaboration with the United Nations Zhou has launched a campaign to promote peace.

Speaking Engagements and Collaborations 
Zhou has been selected by the Sundance Film Festival on three consecutive occasions. Since 2010, Yi Zhou has been appointed as art director of Tudou.com. It was her initiative to bridge The Sundance Institute members with the 2011 Tudou Video Festival in China.

Zhou currently develops her own screenplays and produces her upcoming feature films between LA and China bridging the west and east culture in a dynamic dialogue by also giving public speeches at TEDx Paris Salon, Tedx 798 and LVMH labour day and Financial Times Luxury Talks. Yi Zhou has been a frequent speaker of Digital Hollywood since 2018 in Los Angeles, and Montecarlo TV Festival in 2021.

References

Further reading
 The New York Times
 The New York Times
 CNN
 Vogue Italia
 The Wall Street Journal

External links 
 Yi Zhou Venice Biennale collateral exhibition official site

Artists from Shanghai
Living people
1987 births
American University of Paris alumni
Alumni of the London School of Economics
Chinese filmmakers